The Camel Club is a crime novel by American writer David Baldacci. This is the first book to feature the Camel Club, a small group of Washington, D.C. civilian misfits led by "Oliver Stone", an ex-Green Beret and a former CIA trained assassin. The book was initially published on October 25, 2005 by Grand Central Publishing.

References

External links
Official website

2005 American novels
Novels by David Baldacci